Yekkeh Shakh (also Romanized as Yekkeh Shākh) is a village in Garmkhan Rural District, Garmkhan District, Bojnord County, North Khorasan Province, Iran. At the 2006 census, its population was 153, in 38 families.

References 

Populated places in Bojnord County